Bernolák may refer to:

13916 Bernolák, main belt asteroid with an orbital period of 1388
Anton Bernolák (1762–1813), Slovak linguist, Catholic priest and author of the first Slovak language standard
Anton Bernolák's Chapel, in Nové Zámky, Slovakia, built in 1722 in the baroque style
Field Army Bernolák, infantry unit during World War II in Jozef Tiso's Axis World War II Slovaka